Raipur and Bhagwanpur is a village in Samastipur district of Bihar.

Surroundings
Kishanpur, Chatneswar, Nakta Chowk, Gohi, Warisnagar, and Candauli are nearby.

Transportation
Moglani Road passes through Kishanpur Railway Station. The nearest airport is Patna Airport.

Villages in Samastipur district